Richard James Seiling (born December 15, 1957) is a Canadian former professional ice hockey player. He spent the majority of his 738-game National Hockey League (NHL) career with the Buffalo Sabres, but also played one season for the Detroit Red Wings. After his retirement he became a successful harness racer, coach and broadcaster.

Junior career
Seiling, at 16, joined the Hamilton Fincups of the Ontario Major Junior Hockey League at the start of the 1974–75 season. He spent three seasons with the franchise, which moved to St. Catharines in 1976, amassing 117 goals and 142 assists in 189 regular season games. The Fincups played in the 1976 Memorial Cup, where Seiling posted three goals and nine points in three appearances, leading all players in scoring and earning a berth on the Memorial Cup all-star team.

The following season, his last in junior, Seiling was selected to play for Canada's national junior squad, winning a silver medal while scoring three goals and three assists in seven games. Teammates on the Canadian roster that year included future number one draft picks Dale McCourt and Rob Ramage, as well as Ron Duguay, John Anderson, Dave Hunter and Al Secord.

NHL career
Seiling was drafted 14th overall by the Buffalo Sabres in the 1977 NHL amateur draft.
Seiling played all 80 games during his rookie season of 1977–78, scoring 19 goals and 19 assists for 38 points. His goal total increased for the next three seasons, when he peaked with a career-high 30 in 1980–81. He spent five more seasons with the Sabres, but was dealt to the Detroit Red Wings on October 7, 1986, where he played his final year in the NHL. He totaled 179 goals and 208 assists for 387 points in his career. He also picked up 573 penalty minutes. In 62 playoff games he had 14 goals and 14 assists for 28 points.

Seiling was sent to the American Hockey League's Adirondack Red Wings in 1987–88, and retired after a season spent as a player-assistant coach.

Coaching career
He returned to coaching in 1994 with the Utica Blizzard of the Colonial Hockey League, leading the team to a 31–38–5 record and an eventual first round loss in the postseason. Seiling also played as a replacement player in one game, as an emergency replacement of a replaced player in the lineup that required replacing. 

The following year he took the reins of the Ontario Hockey League's Owen Sound Platers, but was replaced midway through the year.

He spent parts of the next three seasons behind the bench in the Central Hockey League, first with San Antonio and later with the Tulsa Oilers.

During the inaugural season of the NWHL's Buffalo Beauts, Seiling was the co-coach along with Shelley Looney. For the 2016–17 Buffalo Beauts season, Seiling was named the general manager. He was fired on December 7, 2018.

Broadcasting
Seiling is a color analyst for the Rochester Americans broadcasts on MSG Western New York and WROC.

Personal life
Seiling has four children: Melody, Krystal, Zachary and Jeremy. He is the younger brother of fellow long-time NHL player Rod Seiling.

Career statistics

Regular season and playoffs

International

References

External links

1957 births
Living people
Buffalo Sabres draft picks
Buffalo Sabres players
Detroit Red Wings players
Hamilton Fincups players
National Hockey League first-round draft picks
Ice hockey people from Ontario
People from Woolwich, Ontario
Winnipeg Jets (WHA) draft picks
American Hockey League broadcasters
Premier Hockey Federation coaches
Canadian ice hockey right wingers
Canadian ice hockey coaches